Pentti Pesonen (born 7 April 1938) is a Finnish former cross-country skier who competed in the early 1960s. He earned a silver medal in the 4 × 10 km relay at the 1962 FIS Nordic World Ski Championships in Zakopane.

Cross-country skiing results

World Championships
 1 medals – (1 silver)

External links
World Championship results 

1938 births
Living people
People from Varkaus
Finnish male cross-country skiers
FIS Nordic World Ski Championships medalists in cross-country skiing
Sportspeople from North Savo
20th-century Finnish people